Teufel is a German-language surname which comes from the word "devil".

Those bearing it include:

Erwin Teufel, German Christian Democratic Union politician and former minister-president of Baden-Württemberg
Fritz Teufel, late German 1960s’ revolutionary and "Fun Guerilla"
Harald Teufel, Technical Research Staff at Max Planck Institute of Biological Cybernetics
Hugo Teufel Jr., late professor of mathematics at Wichita State University
Hugo Teufel III, former Chief Privacy Officer for the 1U.S. Department of Homeland Security
June Teufel Dreyer, Senior Fellow at the Foreign Policy Research Institute and Professor at the University of Miami
Stephan Teufel, Professor at the University of Tübingen
Stephanie Teufel, Professor at the University of Fribourg
Simone Teufel, professor at the University of Cambridge
Stefan Teufel, German Christian Democratic Union politician
Thomas Teufel, Professor at the Baruch College
Tim Teufel, former Major League Baseball player and current manager

References

Surnames from nicknames
German-language surnames